Juku-Kalle Raid (born 28 July 1974) is an Estonian politician. He was a member of XII Riigikogu.

References

Living people
1974 births
Isamaa politicians
Estonian Independence Party politicians
Place of birth missing (living people)
Members of the Riigikogu, 2011–2015